Mariame Gbané (born April 16, 1982) is an Ivorian female professional basketball player. She was a member of the 2007 Ivory Coast national basketball team.

References 

1982 births
Living people
Ivorian women's basketball players